KEKE (channel 14) is a Spanish-language independent television station in Hilo, Hawaii, United States, owned by Halepule Television, LLC. The station's transmitter is located west of Hilo.

Channel 14 in Hilo was started as KWHH, a satellite of LeSEA Broadcasting's KWHE on Oahu, on October 1, 1989; it retained that status for more than 30 years. It became KWHD in 2010, warehousing a call sign that was used on channel 53 near Denver, which LeSEA had just sold. On August 12, 2020, Family Broadcasting (the former LeSEA) announced it would sell KWHD to Halepule Television for $100,000; the sale was completed on September 25. The call letters were changed to KEKE on November 8, 2021.

Technical information

Analog-to-digital conversion
After Hawaii's switch to DTV on January 15, 2009 (five months earlier than the June 12 transition date for stations on the U.S. mainland), KWHH remained on its pre-transition UHF channel 23.

References

Independent television stations in the United States
Television channels and stations established in 1989
EKE (TV)
1989 establishments in Hawaii